Cedar Bay is a stream in Wayne County in the U.S. state of Missouri. It is a tributary of the Black River.

Missouri Route 34 and Missouri Route 49 run parallel to the stream channel for its entire course.

Cedar Bay, historically called "Cedar Bay Branch", was so named on account of cedar timber near its course.

See also
List of rivers of Missouri

References

Rivers of Wayne County, Missouri
Rivers of Missouri
Tributaries of the Black River (Arkansas–Missouri)